William Douglas Hall Baillie (22 February 1827 – 24 February 1922) was a New Zealand politician. He was known as W. D. H. Baillie and often referred to as Captain Baillie owing to his military background.

Early life
Baillie was born in 1827 in Fredericton, New Brunswick, Canada. His parents were Thomas Baillie from Scotland and his first wife, Elizabeth (née Monckton-Hall). His parents had married in 1824 in Limerick, Ireland, and later that year, Thomas Baillie had joined the Colonial Office, and had quickly been appointed commissioner of Crown lands and Surveyor General of New Brunswick. Baillie Jr. received his education at Royal Military Academy, Woolwich. He received a commission to the 24th (2nd Warwickshire) Regiment of Foot and spent six years in India, where he saw action in the Second Anglo-Sikh War, with battles at the Chenab River, at Sadoolapore, Chillianwala, and Gujrat. He returned to England in 1853 and was promoted to the rank of captain.

Baillie married Hannah Maria Ann Greensill on 11 July 1854 at West Thurrock in Essex. She was the daughter of John Greensill, and a cousin of Frederick Roberts, the latter of whom would make a career with the British army. The Baillies were to have three sons and one daughter.

Life in New Zealand
Baillie resigned from the army in 1857 and the family came to New Zealand on the Oriental.

Baillie was first elected to the Marlborough Provincial Council in 1860, when he represented the Wairau electorate. He was the second Superintendent of Marlborough Province (28 August 1861 – 18 February 1863) and the longest-serving member of the New Zealand Legislative Council; 61 years, from 8 March 1861 to his death on 24 February 1922. He was the second Chairman of Committees of the Legislative Council. From 1890, Baillie's vision deteriorated and later on, he was totally blind. His wife would bring him into the Legislative Council chamber and put him into his seat. He was last elected as Chairman of Committees in 1901 when he consented to stand in a ballot; the intention was to keep out the government nominee, William Cowper Smith. Once Smith was eliminated from the ballot, Baillie wanted to withdraw, but the Speaker would not allow him to speak over a misunderstanding. When the other remaining candidate, John Rigg, withdrew, Baillie was declared elected.

Hannah Baillie died on 12 November 1919 in Wellington. Captain Baillie died aged 95 at his daughter's residence in Maoribank, Upper Hutt, New Zealand on 24 February 1922. His funeral was held at what is now known as Old St. Paul's in Wellington. The Baillies are buried at Karori Cemetery. Two of his sons had died before him.

Notes

References

|-

1827 births
1922 deaths
Members of the New Zealand Legislative Council
People from Picton, New Zealand
Members of the Marlborough Provincial Council
Superintendents of New Zealand provincial councils
Graduates of the Royal Military Academy, Woolwich
British military personnel of the Second Anglo-Sikh War
Burials at Karori Cemetery